Brandy Fisher (born October 28, 1975) is an American former ice hockey forward. She played for the New Hampshire Wildcats women's ice hockey program and was the first ever winner of the Patty Kazmaier Award, awarded to the top female ice hockey player in the NCAA. Brandy was born in Potsdam, New York.

Playing career
One of the highlights of her NCAA career came in the 1996 ECAC Tournament. She scored the game-winning goal to end the longest game in NCAA men's and women's ice hockey history at that time. Her goal against  Providence College at 5:35 of the fifth overtime gave New Hampshire the ECAC championship.

In addition, she played for the United States national women's ice hockey team that participated in the 1999 and 2000 IIHF Women's World Ice Hockey championships.

Awards and honors
Bauer/ECAC Player of the week for March 11, 1996
ECAC Tournament Most Valuable Player (1996)
Patty Kazmaier Award (1998)

References

1975 births
Living people
American women's ice hockey forwards
Ice hockey players from New York (state)
New Hampshire Wildcats women's ice hockey players
Patty Kazmaier Award winners
People from Potsdam, New York